is a public university in Naha, Okinawa, Japan, founded in 1986.

External links
 Official website
 Official website 

Educational institutions established in 1986
Public universities in Japan
Art schools in Japan
Universities and colleges in Okinawa Prefecture
1986 establishments in Japan